Hollandite (chemical formula: Ba(Mn4+6Mn3+2)O16) is an oxide mineral. It is the barium-manganese (III) endmember of the coronadite group. 

A mineral, with the chemical composition BaMn4+6Fe3+2O16, that was first found in the Kajlidongri mine in the Jhabua district of Madhya Pradesh, India, had the name hollandite until it was reclassified as ferrihollandite by the International Mineralogical Association in 2012. Ferrihollandite is the barium-iron (III) endmember of the coronadite group.

Rare quartz inclusion

See also
Manganese dioxide

References

Barium minerals
Manganese(III,IV) minerals
Oxide minerals